The Pance River flows along the southern side of Cali, Colombia and is a popular place for locals for recreation and leisure activities. It is one of the only rivers in the city that is not polluted, and in which people can still swim. 

The Pance River is one of the major rivers in Cali. Pance has a flow rate of  passing through the station Comfamiliar Pance.

In the initial part the waters are fast, cool and clear, showing low levels of contamination. The river is a popular destination for the inhabitants of Cali. In the area known as the Maelstrom there are several restaurants and recreational parks.

Ecology 
Along with the rivers Claro and Jamundí, the number of species of orchids in and around the forests of the Pance river watershed is considerably higher than other sites at a given altitude range.

References

Further reading 

 

Rivers of Colombia